Cord was a brand of American luxury automobile manufactured by the Auburn Automobile Company of Connersville, Indiana, from 1929 to 1932 and again in 1936 and 1937.

Auburn was wholly owned by the Cord Corporation, founded and run by E. L. Cord as a holding company for his many transportation interests (which included the Lycoming engines, Stinson aircraft, and Checker Motors). Cord was noted for its innovative technology and streamlined designs.

Innovations 
Cord innovations include front-wheel drive on the L-29 and hidden headlamps on the 810 and 812.

Though DeSoto used them in 1942, hidden headlamps did not reappear as a luxury feature until the 1960s, beginning with the 1963 Chevrolet Corvette. It was followed two years later by another General Motors product, the Buick Riviera, whose GM stylists later stated they were trying to capture the "feel" of the Cord's design.

"Servo" shifting was accomplished through a Bendix electro-vacuum pre-selector mechanism (a type of electromechanical shifting).

Cord L-29 
This was the first American front-wheel drive car to be offered to the public, beating the Ruxton automobile by several months, in 1929. The brainchild of former Miller engineer Cornelius Van Ranst, its drive system borrowed from the Indianapolis 500-dominating racers, using the same de Dion layout and inboard brakes.  Built in Auburn, Indiana, the Cord was the first front-wheel-drive car to use constant-velocity joints. While commonly used today in all front-wheel-drive vehicles, their first use was on the 1929 Cord. The lack of rear drivetrain components and straight frame (without rear kick-up to clear up the rear axle) allowed it to be much lower in height than competing cars whose average height was about six feet or almost two metres. Both stock cars and special bodies built on the Cord chassis by American and European coachbuilders won prizes in contests worldwide. The L-29 came with full instrumentation, including a temperature gauge, oil pressure gauge, and speedometer on the left with a gas gauge, oil level gauge, and ammeter on the right of the steering wheel.

It was powered by a Lycoming   L-head inline 8 from the Auburn 120, with the crankshaft pushed out through the front of the block and the flywheel mounted there, driving a three-speed transmission. Still, the styling was lovely, and despite the  wheelbase and steering demanding fully four turns lock-to-lock, handling was reportedly superb. Wheelbase was 137.5" and the height of the sedan was 61". The 1930 Chrysler Imperial and Chrysler Eight copied several styling elements. 

The L-29 was priced around US$3,000 ($ in  dollars ), putting it in the upper tier of America's most expensive luxury automobiles alongside Cadillac, Marmon, Lincoln, Packard, Franklin, and Stutz, and below only Duesenburg. It could not, however, outrun the Great Depression, and by 1932, it was discontinued, with just 4,400 sold.

Cord Model 810/812 

The Model 810/812 are probably the best-known of the company's products. Styled by Gordon M. Buehrig, they featured front-wheel drive and independent front suspension. By placing the transmission ahead of the engine Buehrig was able to eliminate the driveshaft and transmission tunnel. Accentuating its sleek, low-slung look, he also dispensed with running boards. Powered by a  Lycoming V8 of the same  as the L-29's straight-8, the 810 had a four-speed electrically selected semi-automatic transmission,(called a pre-selector because you selected the gear and then stepped on the clutch) among other innovative features like roll up headlights.

The car caused a sensation at the New York Auto Show in November 1935. Orders were taken at the show with Cord promising Christmas delivery, anticipating production of 1,000 per month.  Delays pushed hoped delivery to February 1936 - which still proved optimistic, with owners only beginning to get the first cars in April. In all, Cord managed to sell only 1,174 of the new 810 in its first model year. The car's distinctively squared-off front end and pioneering, streamlined, horizontally louvered grille design earned it the durable nickname "coffin nose".

Demise 
Early reliability problems, including slipping out of gear and vapor lock, cooled initial enthusiasm, and the dealer base shrank rapidly. Unsold left-over and in-process 1936 810s were re-numbered and sold as 1937 812s.  In 1937, Auburn ceased production of the Cord. A single 1938 Cord prototype with some changes to the grille and transmission cover was built, and it still exists (2015).  The Cord empire, amid allegations of financial fraud, was sold to the Aviation Corporation, and E.L. Cord moved to Nevada where he earned millions in real estate and other enterprises.

Hupmobile/Graham

In 1940 ailing automakers Hupmobile and Graham-Paige tried to save money and revive the companies, by using the 810/812 body dies.  Except for their similarity to the 810, their four-door sedans, the Hupp Skylark and the Graham Hollywood, were unremarkable. Retractable headlights gave way to plain headlight pods, and power came from a standard front-engine/rear-wheel drive design. While Hupp Motor Company built a few prototypes in 1939 that gained them sales orders for the 1939 model year they did not have the resources to manufacture the car. Graham Paige stepped in offering to build the Hupmobile Skylarks on a per piece contract basis. Graham built a combined 1850 units for sale in the 1940 model year. Hupmobile closed before the 1941 model came around. Of the 1850 cars produced in the 1940 model year by Graham only about 450 were the Hupmobile Skylarks. Graham continued to build the Hollywood late into 1941. They stopped production in November of that year having only built a rumored 400 units. The Hollywood was powered by a supercharged Continental in line six making 124 HP, almost 50 less than the original supercharged Cord.

Trivia

The plot of the David Niven movie Where the Spies Are features a rare Cord convertible as the incentive for the hero to undertake an espionage mission. The movie was based on the James Leasor novel Passport to Oblivion, which is one of a series of suspense/intrigue novels featuring the fictitious Dr. Jason Love, whose "infatuation" with the Cord roadster played a prominent part.

In the novel Live and Let Die, Felix Leiter drives a Cord of unspecified model when he and James Bond are in Florida.

The original design for the Batmobile was a red convertible based on the Cord 812, which Batman creator Bob Kane considered one of his favorite vehicles and fitting for the millionaire vigilante.

The 1965 film What's New Pussycat? featured a rather battered red Cord 810 convertible with French selective yellow headlights. The car was piloted in several scenes by Woody Allen whose character drove on the Paris pavements (sidewalks).

A yellow Cord 810 is seen driven by young gangster Bobby Malto in the 1991 TV-Movie "The Return of Eliot Ness", which starred Robert Stack, reprising his title role from "The Untouchables" 1959-1963 TV series.

In the 1994 film The Shadow, Moses Shrevnitz (Peter Boyle) drives a 1936 Cord 810 Westchester that was stretched and custom-painted as a taxi cab.

"bePUZZLED" brand puzzles is a series of puzzles which feature a short mystery story to go along with the picture in the assembled puzzle. A puzzle and story in the series is called A Classic Case of Murder and features a creme colored 1936 810 Cord in the story and pictured in the puzzle.  Copyright 1992.

In the 2001 PlayStation exclusive car combat game Twisted Metal: Black. The playable driver No-Face has a car based on the Cord 810,
nicknamed "Crazy 8".

In the 2002 PC and PlayStation 2 game Mafia: The City of Lost Heaven the Cord 810 and 812 are featured under a cover-up names Thor 810 and Thor 812 FWD. The Thor 810 is based on the normally aspirated version with no outside exhaust, while the Thor 812 FWD, available only as a convertible in the game, is based on the supercharged version with the outside exhausts on the side of the engine bay. The player could even feel the car being front wheel drive, as the game featured sophisticated physical model of all cars (and guns for that matter) and so the Thor handled differently than the other rear driven cars. In the 2020 remake of the game, only one version is featured under the name Berkeley 810 and is derived from the two door supercharged version with a solid roof. 

As part of his series Jay Leno's Garage in 2013, Jay featured his own Cord 812 which he had previously written about in Popular Mechanics. The car had been lovingly restored by amateur restorer Arthur Pirre.

On Gram Parsons' 1973 album GP, the song "The New Soft Shoe" is written about E.L Cord and his famous automobiles.

In classic crime film The Godfather, a Cord 810 convertible is briefly seen on the estate of Jack Woltz.

Some sung versions of Rodgers and Hart song The Lady is a Tramp refer to "Lincolns and Cords"

See also 
 Century Airlines pilots' strike
 List of automobile manufacturers
 List of defunct United States automobile manufacturers

References

Sources
 Wise, David Burgess. "Cord: The Apex of a Triangle", in Northey, Tom, ed. World of Automobiles, Vol. 4, pp. 435–7. London: Orbis, 1974.

External links 

 Auburn-Cord-Duesenberg Club
 Auburn/Cord/Duesenberg Museum
 Auburn-Cord-Dusenberg Flickr Group
 Automotive History Online - Cord History and Photos Albums
 CordNet, a site for Cord enthusiasts
 History of second generation Cord Automobiles

References 
 Malks, Josh B. Cord 810/812: The Timeless Classic.

Defunct motor vehicle manufacturers of the United States
Luxury motor vehicle manufacturers
Motor vehicle manufacturers based in Indiana
Streamline Moderne cars
Defunct manufacturing companies based in Indiana
Front-wheel-drive vehicles
Defunct brands
Vehicle manufacturing companies established in 1929
Luxury vehicles